Colorectal surgery is a field in medicine dealing with disorders of the rectum, anus, and colon. The field is also known as proctology, but this term is now used infrequently within medicine and is most often employed to identify practices relating to the anus and rectum in particular.

Physicians specializing in this field of medicine are called colorectal surgeons or proctologists. In the United States, to become colorectal surgeons, surgical doctors have to complete a general surgery residency as well as a colorectal surgery fellowship, upon which they are eligible to be certified in their field of expertise by the American Board of Colon and Rectal Surgery or the American Osteopathic Board of Proctology. In other countries, certification to practice proctology is given to surgeons at the end of a 2–3 year subspecialty residency by the country's board of surgery.

Scope of the specialty

Colorectal surgical disorders include:

 varicosities or swelling, and inflammation of veins in the rectum and anus (hemorrhoids)
 unnatural cracks or tears in the anus (anal fissures)
 abnormal connections or passageways between the rectum or other anorectal area to the skin surface (fistulas)
 severe constipation conditions
 fecal incontinence
 protrusion of the walls of the rectum through the anus (rectal prolapse)
 birth defects such as the imperforate anus
 treatment of severe colic disorders, such as Crohn's disease
 cancer of the colon and rectum (colorectal cancer)
 repositioning of the rectal area if fallen out
 anal cancer
 any injuries to the anus
 removal of objects inserted into anus

Surgical treatment and diagnostic procedures

Surgical forms of treatment for these conditions include: colectomy, ileo/colostomy, polypectomy, strictureplasty, hemorrhoidectomy (in severe cases of hemorrhoids), minimally invasive surgery, anoplasty, and more depending on the condition the patient has. Diagnostic procedures, such as a colonoscopy, are very important in colorectal surgery, as they can tell the physician what type of diagnosis should be given and what procedure should be done to correct the condition. Other diagnostic procedures used by colorectal surgeons include: proctoscopy, defecating proctography, sigmoidoscopy.   In recent times, the laparoscopic method of surgery has seen a surge of popularity, due to its lower risks, decreased recovery time, and smaller, more precise incisions achieved by using laparoscopic instruments.

Mechanical bowel preparation
Mechanical bowel preparation (MBP) is a procedure lacking evidence in the literature, wherein fecal matter is expelled from the bowel lumen prior to surgery, most commonly by using sodium phosphate.

In popular culture
In the Seinfeld episode "The Fusilli Jerry", Kramer erroneously gets the vanity plate "ASSMAN". He later finds out the plate belongs to a proctologist. Kramer claims the proctologists he has met always talk about patients concocting absurd stories of how an item accidentally ended up in their colon to avoid admitting that they deliberately inserted the object into their anus.

See also
 Proctalgia fugax

References

 
Rectum